This discography documents albums and singles released by American R&B/soul singer Phyllis Hyman.

Albums

Studio albums

Compilation albums

Singles

References

Discographies of American artists
Rhythm and blues discographies
Soul music discographies
Vocal jazz discographies